The basketball tournaments of NCAA Season 89 are the Philippines' National Collegiate Athletic Association tournaments for basketball in its 2013–14 season. De La Salle-College of Saint Benilde hosted the season, starting with an opening ceremony held on June 22, 2013, at the Mall of Asia Arena followed by a double-header. Games then are subsequently being held at Filoil Flying V Arena, with seniors' games on Mondays, Thursdays and Saturdays aired on AksyonTV.

Seniors' tournament

Teams

Elimination round

Team standings

Match-up results

Scores

Third–seed playoff
Winner faces Letran, while loser faces San Beda, in the semifinals. Either way, both teams have to win twice in the semifinals to progress.

Bracket

Semifinals
Letran and San Beda have the twice-to-beat advantage; they only have to win once, while their opponents twice, to advance to the Finals.

San Beda vs. Perpetual

Letran vs. San Sebastian

Finals
The finals is a best-of-3 series.

Finals Most Valuable Player:

Awards 
Most Valuable Player: 
Mythical Five:
 
  
  
  
  
Defensive Player of the Year: 
Rookie of the Year: 
Most Improved Player:

Juniors' tournament

Elimination round

Team standings

Match-up results

Scores

Bracket

Stepladder semifinals
Each game is sudden-death.

First round

Second round

Finals

Finals Most Valuable Player:

Awards 
Most Valuable Player: 
Rookie of the Year: 
Mythical Five:

Most Improved Player: 
Defensive Player of the Year:

See also
UAAP Season 76 basketball tournaments

References

Overall Championship points

In case of ties, the team with the higher position in any tournament is ranked higher; if both are still tied, they are listed by alphabetical order.

Seniors' division

Juniors' division

External links
Official website

89
2013–14 in Philippine college basketball